Wutthipan Pantalee (born April 30, 1985) is a professional footballer from Thailand. He currently plays for Trat in the Thai League 2.

External links
Profile at Thaipremierleague.co.th

1985 births
Living people
Wutthipan Pantalee
Wutthipan Pantalee
Association football midfielders
Wutthipan Pantalee
Wutthipan Pantalee
Wutthipan Pantalee
Wutthipan Pantalee
Wutthipan Pantalee